Pablo Pinillos Caro (born 9 July 1974) is a Spanish former footballer who played as a right-back.

In a 15-year old professional career, he appeared in 213 La Liga games over the course of eight seasons (three goals), mainly representing Racing de Santander.

Club career

Early years
Born in Murillo de Río Leza, La Rioja, Pinillos played professionally for modest clubs in his early years, working as a bricklayer before arriving at Segunda División B team Pontevedra CF in 1996, eight hours a day.

After an uneventful two-year stint with Deportivo de La Coruña, he moved to Segunda División sides CD Toledo, SD Compostela and Levante UD, achieving La Liga promotion at the end of the 2003–04 season with the latter.

Racing Santander
Upon Levante's 2005 relegation, Pinillos joined Cantabria's Racing de Santander, where he coincided with former Levante coach Manuel Preciado. There, he was an undisputed defensive starter and one of the team's captains, being instrumental in their 2007–08 historic qualification to the UEFA Cup – 32 matches, 2,716 minutes.

In the following campaign, the 34-year-old Pinillos played 29 league games plus three in the continental competition, as Racing finished in 12th position. He scored his first goal in the top flight on 26 April 2009, but in a 2–1 away loss against Athletic Bilbao.

In early July 2011, after 191 official appearances with Racing (and 20 during the season as they again retained their division status), Pinillos retired from football at the age of 37, having taken part in 354 matches both major levels of Spanish football combined. He immediately joined the club's coaching staff.

After the dismissal of manager Juanjo González on 7 March 2012, Pinillos was promoted to caretaker manager alongside Fede Castaños until the end of the campaign. Shortly after, however, Álvaro Cervera was appointed as the new coach.

Honours
Calahorra
Tercera División: 1995–96

Levante
Segunda División: 2003–04

References

External links

1974 births
Living people
Spanish footballers
Footballers from La Rioja (Spain)
Association football defenders
La Liga players
Segunda División players
Segunda División B players
Tercera División players
CD Calahorra players
Pontevedra CF footballers
Deportivo Fabril players
Deportivo de La Coruña players
CD Toledo players
SD Compostela footballers
Levante UD footballers
Racing de Santander players